Waldemar Malak (July 17, 1970 in Gdańsk – November 13, 1992) was a weightlifter from Poland.  He represented his native country at the 1992 Summer Olympics in Barcelona, where he received the bronze medal in the first heavyweight category of weightlifting.

On November 14, 1992, Malak was killed in a car accident in Charwatynia at the age of 22.

References

External links
 
 

1970 births
1992 deaths
Polish male weightlifters
Olympic weightlifters of Poland
Weightlifters at the 1992 Summer Olympics
Olympic bronze medalists for Poland
Road incident deaths in Poland
Olympic medalists in weightlifting
Sportspeople from Gdańsk
Medalists at the 1992 Summer Olympics
20th-century Polish people